Francesco Bruni (born c. 1660 at Genoa) was an Italian engraver. He engraved a plate of The Assumption of the Virgin after Guido Reni.

References

1660 births
Artists from Genoa
Italian engravers
Year of death unknown